The Denver Pioneers men's ice hockey team is a National Collegiate Athletic Association (NCAA) Division I college ice hockey program that represents the University of Denver. The Pioneers are a member of the National Collegiate Hockey Conference (NCHC). They play at Magness Arena in Denver, Colorado. The Pioneers are tied with Michigan for the most all-time NCAA National Hockey Championships with nine (1958, 1960, 1961, 1968, 1969, 2004, 2005, 2017, 2022). Previously, the Pioneers were members of the Western Collegiate Hockey Association (WCHA), from its creation in 1959 to the end of its men's hockey competition in 2013. The Pioneers have won 15 Regular Season Conference Championships (13 WCHA, 2 NCHC) and 14 Conference Playoff Championships (15 WCHA, 2 NCHC).

About 75 Pioneers have gone on to play in the National Hockey League, including Keith Magnuson, Kevin Dineen, Matt Carle (2006 Hobey Baker Award winner), Paul Stastny and Will Butcher (2017 Hobey Baker Award winner).

History
Source:

Early years
In 1949 the DU Arena, a former WWII surplus drill hall from Idaho was reassembled in Denver with an ice plant, giving the university the ability to properly field an ice hockey team for the first time. Before the end of the year Vern Turner, the rink manager for the Broadmoor Ice Palace and a former semi-professional goaltender was hired as the team's first coach and the Pioneers hit the ice for their first game in December, losing to the University of Saskatchewan, 17–0. Denver would, unsurprisingly, lose its first 9 games before recording the first victory against Wyoming on January 27. The following season saw much improvement with the team as it finished with an 11–11–1 record and when Turner stepped down after the year it gave Neil Celley the opportunity to build the program. When Celley assumed the reins he was the youngest head coach in the history of college ice hockey at 24 and had won a national title with Michigan the year before, as a player. The team responded to Celley by raising their record to 18–6–1 and finishing tied for second in the inaugural MCHL standings. Unfortunately, Celley's old team was selected ahead of Denver for the NCAA tournament due to a better overall record. The Pioneers would continue to play well under Celley but their winning percentage dropped every year until 1956 when they finished just a hair above .500. Celley resigned after that season and turned the team over to ex-NHLer Murray Armstrong.

Armstrong era
Armstrong came to DU and guaranteed an NCAA title within three years, and did it in his second year. The team, using Armstrong's coaching pipeline to ex-Junior players in Canada, took a year to get going, but by 1958 the DU team started firing on all cylinders. Denver won its first conference title (tying with North Dakota) and received the second western seed for its first NCAA tournament bid. Denver did not let the bright lights stun them as they rolled through the competition, winning both games 6–2 and taking their first NCAA National Title in Minneapolis. The next season, an argument between conference members over the recruitment of Canadian players who had played junior hockey, caused the WIHL to collapse and left Denver without a conference. Denver struggled to fill out its schedule and though DU finished with the best record of any western team (22–5–1) their competition was so paltry that the Pioneers were passed over in favor of North Dakota (who had taken three of four matches between them) for the NCAA tournament with Big Ten champion Michigan State receiving the other bid. After that disaster, all teams that had been in the WIHL restarted the conference under a new name (WCHA) and instituted a playoff among other reforms. Because the matter of recruitment was left unchanged, Denver was able to take full advantage and build their program into the dominant power for the duration of the decade.

Early 60s
Denver kicked off its first season in the WCHA by winning the regular season title and being WCHA tournament co-champions along with Michigan Tech. The WCHA had arranged its tournament to take advantage of the NCAA bid policy that would give automatic bids to tournament champions and because there was no rival western conference the WCHA could guarantee that both of its co-champions would make the frozen four. Denver won both of its NCAA games and captured the 1960 National Title. The Tournament MOP was split for the first time that year and while it was given to three separate players, none of them wore Denver sweaters. The Pioneers followed up their second championship by thoroughly dominating the competition in 1961. In what is typically ranked among the best seasons ever, the squad began with five victories before dropping a match to Michigan Tech on the road and then never lost another game. The '61 Pioneers scored 242 times in only 32 contests for a rate of just over 7.5 goals per game. Additionally, they allowed just 59 goals against in that time (1.84). While neither marks were records, the average scoring differential of +5.72 is still an NCAA record. Denver had the second-and third-leading scoring in the nation who were only topped by Phil Latreille scoring an all-time NCAA record of 80 goals in 21 games. Not only did the Pioneers post the first 30-win season in NCAA history but, by playing in every game, George Kirkwood set an NCAA record for wins in a season (30). Denver made sure they also did their damage when it counted the most; in the four playoff games they played (2 conference, 2 NCAA) the Pioneers won each by at least 5 goals and won all four matches by a total of 35–6. In the NCAA championship game against St. Lawrence, Denver surrendered the first goal but ended the night by scoring the final nine (an NCAA record) and won the game by 10 goals, 12-2 (also an NCAA record) and were one short of tying the NCAA record of 13 in the championship game. Denver tied the record by placing 5 players on the All-Tournament Team and set the record with 5 players on the All-WCHA First Team as well as the AHCA All-American Team and swept all 5 individual awards offered that year. Three of the players from that team eventually played in the NHL, a rare occurrence for NCAA teams at the time.

After such unparalleled dominance, it was expected that Denver would decline the following year, especially with so many of the players graduating, but the team still finished 3rd in the WCHA. One year later they won both WCHA conference titles and again made the NCAA tournament. After dropping Clarkson in a relatively easy 6–2 semifinal match Denver faced off against North Dakota for a rematch of it first title in 1958. The Fighting Sioux scored three times before 8 minutes had elapsed and, while Denver responded with two quick goals, North Dakota tacked on two more in the first to finish with a 5–2 lead. When they added another 5 minutes into the second it looked as if they were going to walk to a national title but the Pioneers did npt quit and scored twice to cut the lead in half entering the third. North Dakota closed ranks and set up a wall in front of Rudy Unis in the final frame but still could not stop Denver from scoring, however, the Pioneers could only notch one goal and lost their first NCAA tournament game, 5–6. The team's streak of seven consecutive tournament wins from the start is still an NCAA record.

Denver followed up that disappointment with a second-place finish despite playing only 10 games and a WCHA tournament championship over Michigan. In the NCAA tournament DU produced a very similar result to the year before by dropping their semifinal opponent easily, then allowing the team they defeated in the WCHA championship to score the first three goals. This time it was the Wolverines who would take the title and send the Pioneers home disappointed. The next season Denver finished with a record of 18–8–2, one of the best in the nation, but because they only played 12 conference games and won only 4 matches they finished 6th in the WCHA and were left out of the conference playoffs. The following season Denver increased their conference schedule to 20 games but because the WCHA added Minnesota–Duluth as a member, the conference tournament now included all 8 teams. Denver was given a regional matchup against the dismal Colorado College Tigers and took the game easily to give them a shot against arch-nemesis North Dakota for an entry to the NCAA tournament. Despite being the lower seed the game was played in Denver's home stadium due in part to a terrible blizzard that dropped more than two feet around Grand Forks. The home game may have given Denver just enough of an advantage and the Pioneers edged UND, 5–4 in overtime to return to the NCAA tournament. Once there Denver faced Clarkson for the third time in the semifinal but the Golden Knights were able to avenge their earlier losses and send DU to its first consolation game. Though they won the match the Pioneers and their fans were far from satisfied with the result. The following season Denver rose to 2nd in the conference but because the WCHA tournament was still arranged for regional matchups the Pioneers had to play top seed North Dakota in the second round and the Fighting Sioux were able to redeem themselves with a win.

Late 60s
While many programs may have been happy with the results Denver achieved in '66 and '67 the Pioneers were decidedly nonplussed. When the team began 1968 season slowly, losing three out of their first five games, they were taken to task and responded by winning every remaining game except for a stretch in late December when they played four Olympic squads. Denver finished the season atop the WCHA and with the regional restrictions abolished they were able to take full advantage of their top seed and demolish their competition 27–7 in the three games. In the NCAA tournament Denver faced Boston College for the first time and swatted the Eagles away with a 4–1 victory despite sloppy play. The final brought North Dakota and DU together for a rubber match and the two teams fought a tough defensive battle through two periods before the floodgates opened and Denver scored four times in the final frame while Gerry Powers earned the first shutout in a championship game. The next season was much the same; after a slow start the Pioneers ran through most of their competition, finishing second in the WCHA and taking down much weaker opponents in the conference tournament to return to the NCAA playoff. For this 1969 championship they beat Harvard 9–2 in the opening match before facing Ken Dryden-led Cornell. The Pioneers did not have any problems scoring against the seemingly impregnable Big Red defense, building leads three times while the final one stuck and Denver won its fifth NCAA national title, 4–3.

Dynasty's end
Despite losing many players from the dual national title teams due to graduations Denver did not lose much footing and finished second in the WCHA but lost to new entry Wisconsin in the conference tournament. The next season, Denver finished second for the third straight year and were able to win another league co-championship and receive the top western seed. The Pioneers had to settle for a third place NCAA finish after losing only their second semifinal game in nine opportunities. The next season, Denver won both conference titles for the fifth time in their history but were stunned by a 2–7 loss to Cornell in the semifinal, the team's worst loss to a college team in over six years. As if their recent tournament collapses needed a concrete symbol, the DU Arena roof failed in 1972 and forced the team to play most of their remaining home games at the Denver Coliseum. While the Pioneers were able to overcome that difficulty and win the WCHA yet again and finish as the NCAA runner-up it was a battle off the ice that would eventually cost them dearly.

Throughout the 1960s, the matter of recruiting Canadian major junior players was becoming an issue again, and by the 1970s, Minnesota coach John Mariucci was pushing the NCAA for change. Mariucci did not like his teenage American players, who grew up playing locally in Minnesota, playing against older Canadian players that Denver recruited, due to Denver's lack of local players to recruit. Minnesota even refused to schedule the Pioneers for years in the 1960s, which spurred the NCAA to support Minnesota's position. In 1974, the NCAA asked all schools that rostered major junior Canadian players to declare these students ineligible and in recompense, the current players would have their NCAA eligibility restored as a grandfathering ploy, with all future major junior players remaining ineligible. While most universities acceded to the NCAA demand, Denver did not. The school refused to call its own players 'cheaters', and ended up paying the price. The university had its trip to the 1973 tournament vacated and with its pipeline from Canada cut, the team began to falter in the standings. 1974–75 saw Denver post its first losing season since Armstrong's first year and while the team was slowly recovering, DU would not make another tournament appearance until long after his retirement in 1977.

Decline
Armstrong's assistant Marshall Johnston took over and the team jumped up in the standings as the nation's top-ranked team, winning the WCHA regular season crown and breaking the school record for wins with 33 (albeit in 40 games) but DU was stopped in the WCHA second round by an upstart Colorado College team, after finding out that Denver's appeal to be eligible for the 1978 NCAA tournament was denied by the NCAA. After declining to 6th place the following season. Denver ended 1979–80 dead last in the WCHA and missed the playoffs entirely. The team rebounded the next season but afterwards, Johnston returned to the NHL and the program was given to a third-straight former pro, Ralph Backstrom. Backstrom's entry coincided with four WCHA members bolting for the CCHA leaving the conference with only 6 schools. The co-championship format was abolished and though Denver provided some glimpse of hope in Backstrom's first season, the team slipped towards the bottom of the division for three seasons. By the end of the 1984–85 season Denver had lost eight consecutive playoff games and was in danger of becoming an afterthought in the WCHA. The 1985–86 team provided a surprising start the following campaign, winning seven of their first eight-game en route to the WCHA regular season and playoff championships over Michigan Tech, Minnesota-Duluth and Minnesota, followed by a home NCAA 7–6 total goal series win over Cornell to make it to the Frozen Four. Denver played a school record 48 games that year, and won 34 contests (also a DU record) despite losing in the NCAA semifinal, 5–2 to Harvard in Providence. The stark turnaround garnered Backstrom the Spencer Penrose Award. The highlights were short-lived, however and over the succeeding four years Denver returned to being a middling team in the WCHA.

Backstrom left in 1990 and was replaced by Frank Serratore. While he would later achieve a great deal of success with Air Force Serratore's time in Denver was the darkest period in the history of the program. In his first season, the Pioneers won only 6 games, losing a school record 30 of 38 matches. The following season brought only marginal improvements but when the team rose above .500 in 1992–93 it looked like Serratore's job may be saved, but after slipping back to 9th in the conference the year after he was out as coach and replaced by Wisconsin alumnus George Gwozdecky.

Gwozdecky era
When Denver hired Gwozdecky, they hoped they were getting the same coach that had won back-to-back CCHA Coach of the Year awards at Miami (Ohio). In his first season in 1995, he delivered by getting the Pioneers to win 10 more games than they had the year before, and jump from 9th in the conference, to a tie for second place and an NCAA win over New Hampshire. After a disappointing opening round loss in the WCHA playoffs the following year, Denver returned to the NCAA tournament in 1997 and beat a very strong Vermont squad in the first round. In 1999 the Pioneers were able to defeat a dominant North Dakota to take their first conference championship in thirteen years, but lost their first NCAA tournament game to Michigan in the first meeting between the two since the Wolverines left the WCHA. Denver stumbled over the next two years before winning their first WCHA regular season title under Gwozdecky, as well as a second conference championship. Unfortunately, the Pioneers found themselves pitted against Michigan in the first game, and lost to the Maize and Blue yet again. The Pioneers lost in the first round of the WCHA tournament each of the next two years, but their record in 2004 was good enough to snag the #2 seed despite the loss.

Back-to-back titles
DU was able to defeat Gwozdecky's previous team, Miami, in a close game before advancing to face North Dakota in the West Regional Final. The top team in the nation held Denver off the scoresheet and out shot the Pioneers 23–13 in the opening two periods but the Fighting Sioux could not get the puck past Adam Berkhoel. The two teams remained scoreless until just 2:29 remained in regulation when Luke Fulghum deflected a puck into the net and sent the Pioneers into the Frozen Four for the first time in 18 years. Denver met Minnesota–Duluth in the semifinal and looked like were outmatched when the Bulldogs scored twice in the first five minutes of the game. Even when Denver cut the lead in half a second power play goal by 2004 Hobey Baker winner Junior Lessard followed soon thereafter. The Pioneers, however, were not deterred and came out firing in the third, tying the score in less than four minutes and adding another two goals before the period was half over. Duluth was so stunned by the comeback that they could only muster 6 shots in the period as Denver took the game to make their first national championship since their vacated appearance in 1973. With Maine as the only obstacle left in their path, Denver put up in front of Adam Berkhoel and allowed only 24 shots to reach their goalie, including none during a 6-on-3 power play advantage in the last minute and a half of the game. Berkhoel earned the shutout, making the lone goal from Gabe Gauthier in the first as the winner.

After winning their first title in 35 years Denver raised their game, tying Colorado College for the WCHA crown and producing the #2 offense in the country. In the WCHA tournament, however, it was their defense that led the way. With rookie goaltender Peter Mannino standing on his head for two shutouts, the Pioneers allowed only two goals in four games, winning three one-goal games to take the conference championship. DU earned the #2 overall seed and had to survive a scare from Bemidji State in their first game. After allowing 3 to the much weaker Beavers, Glenn Fisher was benched in favor of Mannino for the remaining three games and the Pioneers cruised to the championship game with 4–2 and 6–2 wins. In the Final Denver met North Dakota for the fourth time, matching the record for championship meetings with Michigan and Colorado College. The two teams exchanged goals in the first but future NHLer Paul Stastny put the Pioneers into the lead with a power play marker just after the midpoint. With their season on the line North Dakota began an onslaught on the DU net, firing 23 shots in the third but Mannino was equal to the take and kept everything out. The Pioneers scored twice in the third to put the game away and take their seventh national championship.

Playoff disappointments
The next season brought Denver its first Hobey Baker winner in Matt Carle but the team floundered in the first round of the WCHA tournament and this time their record was not good enough to get them into the championship. After another first round exit the following year Denver righted the ship and won the WCHA tournament in 2008. In the first round they found themselves facing conference rival Wisconsin, only the second time in NCAA history that two teams from the same conference met in the opening round. Despite being favored in the game the Pioneers were beaten 2–6 and sent home disappointed. The Pioneers would return to the tournament each of the next five seasons, but the results were much the same, losing in the first round four times and thoroughly dismissed by North Dakota in the 2011 regionals. Despite the regular season success the early playoff exits, coupled with a contract structure dispute, these results led Denver to fire their head coach in 2013, only 17 wins away from tying Murray Armstrong's program record.

New coach, new conference

Gwozdecky's firing coincided with the founding of the NCHC, a power conference that was created due to Wisconsin and Minnesota leaving to restart the Big Ten hockey division. Denver was accompanied by all of its traditional rivals and began its tenure under Jim Montgomery but finishing 6th in the 8-team conference. Despite their lackluster start the Pioneers were provided with an opportunity by facing weaker-than-expected opposition in the final two games and were able to win the inaugural championship, as they had done with the WCHA 54 years earlier. The Pioneer's NCAA run was predictably short-lived but the team seemed to have found new life under Montgomery's watch which they demonstrated by increasing their win total in each of the next three years. In addition they won progressively more tournament games, reaching the Frozen Four in 2016 before winning the National Championship in 2017 along with getting their second Hobey Baker Award, this one going to Will Butcher. After the team won its second NCHC tournament title in 2018, Montgomery left to join the Dallas Stars as head coach. DU replaced Montgomery with his Denver assistant, 28-year-old David Carle. Carle took Denver to the 2019 Frozen Four in his rookie season, after first and second-round NCAA wins over Ohio State and American International, but the Pioneers fell in the Frozen Four semi-finals to Massachusetts, 4–3 in overtime in Buffalo, New York.

9th National Championship
In 2022, following wins against UMass Lowell and Minnesota Duluth, David Carle and the Denver Pioneers entered the Frozen Four for the 18th time in school history.  In the semi-finals, Denver played the University of Michigan.  Carter Savoie scored in overtime to secure a 3-2 victory, and advance the Pioneers to the National Championship game for their 12th time in program history.  In the National Championship game, Denver failed to score until the third period against Minnesota State.  However, Denver finally broke through adding 5 goals to clinch their 9th National Championship in program history.

Season-by-season results

Source:

Denver/Colorado College rivalry

Of all the rivals that the Denver Pioneer's hockey program play against the most intense rivalry is that from Colorado College. Since Denver's hockey program started in 1949 the two schools have played at least four times a season. In the 1993–94 season a gold pan trophy was added as a reward for the winning team thus the rivalry has been dubbed the Battle for the Gold Pan.

Head coaches
David Carle is the current head coach of Denver hockey, hired in May 2018.

Awards and honors

Hockey Hall of Fame
Source:
Craig Patrick (2001)
Glenn Anderson (2008)

United States Hockey Hall of Fame
Source:
Craig Patrick (1996)

NCAA

Individual awards

Hobey Baker Award
Matt Carle: 2006
Will Butcher: 2017

Spencer Penrose Award
Murray Armstrong: 1961
Ralph Backstrom: 1986
George Gwozdecky: 2005
Jim Montgomery: 2017

Tim Taylor Award
Joey LaLeggia: 2012

Mike Richter Award
Tanner Jaillet: 2017

NCAA Division I Ice Hockey Scoring Champion
Ed Beers: 1982
Bobby Brink: 2022

Tournament Most Outstanding Player

 Murray Massier; 1958
 Bill Masterton; 1961
 Gerry Powers; 1968
 Keith Magnuson; 1969
 Adam Berkhoel; 2004
 Peter Mannino; 2005
 Jarid Lukosevicius; 2017
 Michael Benning; 2022

All-Americans
AHCA First Team All-Americans

1951-52: Eddie Miller, F
1957-58: Ed Zemrau, F
1959-60: Marty Howe, D; George Konik, F; Bill Masterton, F
1960-61: George Kirkwood, D; Marty Howe, D; Grant Munro, D; Jerry Walker, F; Bill Masterton, F
1962-63: Bill Staub, F
1964-65: Wayne Smith, D
1965-66: Wayne Smith, D
1966-67: Jim Wiste, F
1967-68: Keith Magnuson, D; Jim Wiste, F
1968-69: Keith Magnuson, D; George Morrison, F
1969-70: George Morrison, F
1970-71: Mike Christie, D; Vic Venasky, F
1971-72: Tom Peluso, F
1972-73: Ron Grahame, G; Rob Palmer, F
1977-78: Ernie Glanville, G; Doug Berry, F
1986-87: Dallas Gaume, F
2003-04: Ryan Caldwell, D
2004-05: Matt Carle, D
2005-06: Matt Carle, D
2009-10: Marc Cheverie, G; Patrick Wiercioch, D; Rhett Rakhshani, F
2013-14: Sam Brittain, G
2014-15: Joey LaLeggia, D
2016-17: Will Butcher, D; Henrik Borgström, F
2017-18: Henrik Borgström, F; Troy Terry, F
2019-20: Ian Mitchell, F
2021-22: Bobby Brink, F

AHCA Second Team All-Americans

1985-86: Chris Olson, G; Jim Smith, F; Dwight Mathiasen, F
1988-89: Daryn McBride, F
1989-90: Dave Shields, F
1998-99: Paul Comrie, F
2001-02: Wade Dubielewicz, G
2004-05: Brett Skinner, D
2005-06: Paul Stastny, F
2007-08: Chris Butler, D
2011-12: Jason Zucker, F
2012-13: Juho Olkinuora, G
2013-14: Joey LaLeggia, D
2014-15: Trevor Moore, F
2015-16: Will Butcher, D
2016-17: Tanner Jaillet, G
2017-18: Tanner Jaillet, G

MCHL/WIHL/WCHA

Individual awards

Most Valuable Player/Player of the Year
 Jerry Walker, F; 1961
 Keith Magnuson, D; 1968
 Ron Grahame, G; 1973
 Dallas Gaume, C; 1986
 Matt Carle, D; 2006
 Marc Cheverie, G; 2010

Defensive Player of the Year
 Aaron MacKenzie, 2003
 Ryan Caldwell, 2004
 Matt Carle, 2006

Goaltender of the Year
 George Kirkwood: 1960, 1961
 Buddy Blom: 1964
 Gerry Powers: 1968
 Ron Grahame: 1973
 Ernie Glanville: 1978
 Wade Dubielewicz: 2001, 2002
 Marc Cheverie: 2010

Student-Athlete of the Year
 Dave Shields, C: 1990
 Brian Konowalchuk, C: 1994
 Petri Gunther, D: 1997
 Connor James, C: 2004
 Ted O'Leary, F: 2006
 J. P. Testwuide, D: 2009

Sophomore/Freshman/Rookie of the Year

 George Kirkwood, G: 1960
 Jack Wilson, D: 1964
 Keith Magnuson, D: 1967
 George Morrison, LW: 1969
 Craig Redmond, D: 1982
 Dave Shields, C: 1987
 Rick Berens, F: 1988
 Paul Stastny, C: 2005
 Jason Zucker, LW: 2011
 Joey LaLeggia, D: 2012

Coach of the Year
 Murray Armstrong: 1961, 1968
 Marshall Johnston: 1978
 Ralph Backstrom: 1986
 George Gwozdecky: 1995, 2002, 2005, 2010

Most Valuable Player in Tournament
 Stephen Wagner: 1999 
 Wade Dubielewicz: 2002

All-Conference
First Team All-MCHL/WIHL/WCHA

 1951–52: Don Burgess, D; Eddie Miller, D
 1952–53: Eddie Miller, D
 1957–58: Ed Zemrau, D
 1959–60: George Kirkwood, G; Marty Howe, D; Bill Masterton, F
 1960–61: George Kirkwood, G; Marty Howe, D; George Konik, D; Bill Masterton, F; Jerry Walker, F
 1961–62: Jack Wilson, D
 1962–63: Bill Staub, F
 1963–64: Bill Staub, F
 1964–65: Wayne Smith, D
 1965–66: Wayne Smith, D
 1966–67: Keith Magnuson, D; Jim Wiste, F
 1967–68: Keith Magnuson, D; Jim Wiste, F
 1968–69: Keith Magnuson, D; George Morrison, F
 1969–70: George Morrison, F
 1970–71: Mike Christie, D
 1971–72: Tom Peluso, F
 1972–73: Ron Grahame, G; Bruce Affleck, D; Rob Palmer, F; Peter McNab, F
 1977–78: Ernie Glanville, G; Doug Berry, F
 1981–82: Ed Beers, F
 1983–84: Jim Leavins, D
 1985–86: Dallas Gaume, F
 1988–89: Daryn McBride, F
 1989–90: Dave Shields, F
 1998–99: Paul Comrie, F
 2001–02: Wade Dubielewicz, G
 2002–03: Aaron MacKenzie, D
 2004–05: Matt Carle, D; Brett Skinner, D
 2005–06: Matt Carle, D; Paul Stastny, F
 2009–10: Marc Cheverie, G; Patrick Wiercioch, D; Rhett Rakhshani, F
 2011–12: Joey LaLeggia, D

Second Team All-MCHL/WIHL/WCHA

 1951–52: Bill Abbott, F
 1952–53: Bill Abbott, F
 1953–54: Bill Abbott, D; Jack Smith, F
 1954–55: Bill Abbott, D; Jack Smith, F
 1955–56: Ed Zemrau, D
 1957–58: Murray Massier, F
 1959–60: George Konik, D; John MacMillan, F
 1961–62: Trent Beatty, F
 1962–63: Jack Wilson, D; Dominic Fragomeni, F
 1963–64: Buddy Blom, G; Wayne Smith, D; Jim Kenning, D
 1967–68: Gerry Powers, G; Cliff Koroll, F
 1968–69: Gerry Powers, G; Tom Miller, F
 1969–70: Tom Gilmore, F
 1970–71: Vic Venasky, F
 1973–74: Bruce Affleck, D
 1976–77: Greg Woods, D
 1977–78: Greg Woods, D; Lex Hudson, D; Perry Schnarr, F
 1980–81: Ken Berry, F
 1985–86: Tom Allen, G; Dwight Mathiasen, F
 1987–88: Daryn McBride, F
 1989–90: Eric Murano, F
 1994–95: Sinuhe Wallinheimo, G
 1995–96: Antti Laaksonen, F
 2000–01: Wade Dubielewicz, G
 2002–03: Wade Dubielewicz, G
 2003–04: Ryan Caldwell, D
 2004–05: Gabe Gauthier, F
 2007–08: Chris Butler, D
 2008–09: Marc Cheverie, G; Patrick Wiercioch, D
 2009–10: Tyler Ruegsegger, F
 2010–11: Matt Donovan, D; Jason Zucker, F; Drew Shore, F
 2011–12: Jason Zucker, F; Drew Shore, F
 2012–13: Juho Olkinuora, G; Joey LaLeggia, D

Third Team All-WCHA

 1996–97: Jim Mullin, G
 1997–98: Paul Comrie, F
 1998–99: James Patterson, F
 2001–02: Adam Berkhoel, G; Aaron MacKenzie, D; Connor James, F
 2002–03: Kevin Doell, F
 2003–04: Adam Berkhoel, G; Gabe Gauthier, F
 2005–06: Ryan Dingle, F
 2006–07: Ryan Dingle, F
 2007–08: Peter Mannino, G; Tyler Bozak, F
 2008–09: Anthony Maiani, F; Rhett Rakhshani, F
 2009–10: Joe Colborne, F

WCHA All-Rookie Team

 1997–98: Mark Rycroft, F
 2000–01: Ryan Caldwell, D
 2003–04: Matt Carle, D
 2004–05: Paul Stastny, F
 2005–06: Chris Butler, D
 2007–08: Tyler Bozak, F
 2008–09: Patrick Wiercioch, D; Joe Colborne, F
 2009–10: Matt Donovan, D
 2010–11: Sam Brittain, G; David Makowski, D; Jason Zucker, F
 2011–12: Juho Olkinuora, G; Joey LaLeggia, D
 2012–13: Nolan Zajac, D

NCHC

Individual awards

Player of the Year
 Joey LaLeggia; 2015
 Will Butcher; 2017
 Henrik Borgström; 2018
 Bobby Brink; 2022

Rookie of the Year
 Danton Heinen; 2015
 Henrik Borgström; 2017
 Carter Mazur; 2022

Goaltender of the Year
 Sam Brittain; 2014
 Tanner Jaillet; 2017, 2018

Forward of the Year
 Trevor Moore; 2015
 Danton Heinen; 2016
 Henrik Borgström; 2018
 Bobby Brink; 2022

Defenseman/Defensive Defenseman of the Year
 Joey LaLeggia; 2014, 2015

Offensive Defenseman of the Year
 Joey LaLeggia; 2014, 2015
 Will Butcher; 2017

Scholar-Athlete of the Year
 Gabe Levin; 2016

Tournament MVP
 Daniel Doremus; 2014
 Tanner Jaillet; 2018

All-Conference
First Team All-NCHC

 2013–14: Sam Brittain, G; Joey LaLeggia, D
 2014–15: Joey LaLeggia, D; Trevor Moore, F
 2015–16: Will Butcher, D; Danton Heinen, F
 2016–17: Tanner Jaillet, G; Will Butcher, D
 2017–18: Tanner Jaillet, G; Henrik Borgström, F
 2019–20: Ian Mitchell, D
 2021–22: Bobby Brink, F

Second Team All-NCHC

 2014–15: Danton Heinen, F
 2016–17: Henrik Borgström, F; Dylan Gambrell, F
 2017–18: Troy Terry, F; Dylan Gambrell, F
 2019–20: Emilio Pettersen, F
 2021–22: Michael Benning, D; Carter Savoie, F

NCHC All-Rookie Team

 2013–14: Trevor Moore, F
 2014–15: Danton Heinen, F
 2015–16: Dylan Gambrell, F
 2016–17: Michael Davies, D; Henrik Borgström, F
 2017–18: Ian Mitchell, D
 2019–20: Magnus Chrona, G; Bobby Brink, F
 2021–22: Sean Behrens, D; Shai Buium, D; Carter Mazur, F; Massimo Rizzo, F

Olympians
This is a list of Denver hockey alumni who were a part of an Olympic team.

† Craig Patrick was an assistant coach for the 1980 team and the general manager for the 2002 team.
* Kevin Dineen was head coach of the Gold Medal Winning Canadian women's team at the 2014 Winter Games in Sochi, Russia.

Statistical leaders
Source:

Career points leaders

Career goaltending leaders

GP = Games played; Min = Minutes played; W = Wins; L = Losses; T = Ties; GA = Goals against; SO = Shutouts; SV% = Save percentage; GAA = Goals against average

Minimum 30 games

Statistics current through the end of the 2020–21 season.

Denver Athletic Hall of Fame
The following is a list of people associated with the Denver men's ice hockey program who were elected into the Denver Athletic Hall of Fame (induction date in parenthesis).

Murray Armstrong (1996)
Keith Magnuson (1996)
Bill Masterton (1996)
Ron Grahame (1997)
George Konik (1997)
Jerry Walker (1999)
Dallas Gaume (2000)
Eddie Miller (2000)
Jim Wiste (2000)
1960 Championship Team (2000)
Marty Howe (2001)
Craig Patrick (2001)
Marshall Johnston (2002)
Cliff Koroll (2003)
1961 Championship Team (2004)
Gerry Powers (2005)
George Kirkwood (2006)
1968 Championship Team (2006)
1958 Championship Team (2008)
1969 Championship Team (2010)
Ed Zemrau (2012)
George Morrison (2012)
John MacMillan (2014)
2004 Championship Team (2014)

Current roster
As of August 26, 2022.

Pioneers in the NHL
As of July 1, 2022.

† Patrick won two Stanley Cups as the general manager for the Pittsburgh Penguins.
@ Dineen won his Stanley Cup as an assistant coach for the Chicago Blackhawks.
# Johnston won his Stanley Cup as an executive for the Carolina Hurricanes.
^ Affleck won his Stanley Cup as an executive for the St. Louis Blues.
& Butler won his Stanley Cup as player for the St. Louis Blues. He did not play enough NHL games to merit engraving his name on trophy that year, but he did get to skate with the Cup in uniform after the final game. He then retired from hockey.

Retired NHL players stats
Note: This is a partial list of NHL players who attended DU (75 DU players have played in the NHL)

Active players stats
Active as of the end of the 2017–18 season

Notes:
 1 Masterton suffered severe head trauma on January 13, 1968, during an NHL game when he fell to the ice and hit his head. He died two days later and became the first player to die as a direct result of an injury during an NHL game. The Bill Masterton Memorial Trophy is awarded annually to the NHL player who best personifies perseverance, sportsmanship and dedication to the game of ice hockey.

WHA
Several players also were members of WHA teams.

Arenas

University of Denver Arena (1948–1997)
University of Denver Arena (DU Arena) was a 5,237-seat multi-purpose arena in Denver. In addition to serving as the Pioneers' home rink, it hosted several Frozen Fours. It was razed in 1997 to make room for the $75 million Magness Arena, (part of the Ritchie Center for Sports and Wellness) which opened in 1999.

Originally a Naval Drill Hall built during World War II in Farragut, Idaho, the DU Arena was donated to the University after the war and reassembled on the Denver campus in 1948–49 to house the University's then-new ice hockey program. The arena was refurbished in 1972–73 when the roof needed repairs, and 14 seven-ton steel trusses were added to shore up the roof. Additional patchwork renovations were added in the 1990s, prior to razing in 1997.

The best known features of the arena were the steep bleacher balcony at the south end, and the 1970s rainbow painted on the north end wall. Famous hockey games held there include the NCAA ice hockey finals in 1961, 1964 and 1976.

Magness Arena (1999–present)
Magness Arena is a 7,200-seat multi-purpose collegiate sports arena in Denver, Colorado. It was built from 1997 to 1999 as part of the Daniel L. Ritchie Center for Sports & Wellness, an $84 million,  sports complex at the University of Denver. It is home to the University of Denver Pioneers ice hockey and basketball teams. The Ritchie Center replaced the former DU Arena and DU Fieldhouse, which were razed in 1997 to make way for the Ritchie Center. The basketball team also plays smaller games at Hamilton Gymnasium, located in the Ritchie Center.

The arena is named after cable television pioneer Bob Magness, who donated $10 million towards construction costs.

Other Colorado Arenas
When the DU Arena roof was being fixed between 1972 and 1973, the Pioneers played home games at the Denver Coliseum.

When Magness Arena was under construction from 1997 to 1999, Denver played its home games at four different arenas around the state: Denver Coliseum, McNichols Arena, Colorado Springs World Arena and at the Air Force Academy's Cadet Ice Arena.

DU has also played a 2012 home exhibition game at Denver's Pepsi Center against the University of British Columbia.

Denver's all-time record hockey crowd was the 2016 regular season outdoor NCHC game against Colorado College, called "The Battle on Blake" before over 35,000 fans at Denver's Coors Field baseball stadium, the most fans to ever see a home DU sporting event in Denver.

DU's indoor record home crowd was the 1995 Denver Cup final at McNichols Arena, where Denver defeated Colorado College before over 16,000 fans.

References

External links
Denver Pioneers men's ice hockey

 
Ice hockey teams in Colorado